Manner is a surname. Notable people with the surname include:

 Eeva-Liisa Manner (1921–1995), Finnish poet, playwright and translator
 Jan Männer (born 1982), German footballer
 Kullervo Manner (1880–1939), Finnish Communist leader
 Riikka Manner (born 1981), Finnish politician

Finnish-language surnames